Scrobipalpa vartianorum is a moth in the family Gelechiidae. It was described by Povolný in 1968. It is found in China (Xinjiang) and northern Iran.

References

Scrobipalpa
Moths described in 1968